A Night to Remember is an album by American pop singer Johnny Mathis that was released on April 29, 2008, by Columbia Records. In the liner notes for the album, executive producer Jay Landers writes that "Johnny combed through his personal album collection and chose 12 songs sure to evoke faces and places from those golden days when 45s were stacked on the record player and local deejays played songs you could actually hum the melody to."

The album reached number 29 on the UK album chart during its two weeks there in August 2008.

Reception
In rating the album at four stars on AllMusic, John Bush praises producer Walter Afanasieff, who "has helmed most of the best records by many artists who have come later and courted the same audience as Mathis... He definitely saved his best for this date, a landmark in his career." The reviewer also gives high marks to the singer: "Mathis sounds fantastic for a septuagenarian... The material he chooses is excellent as well."

Track listing
From the liner notes for the original album:

 "Just the Two of Us" (Ralph MacDonald, William Salter, Bill Withers) – 4:07
  Kenny G – saxophone 
 "You Make Me Feel Brand New" performed with Yolanda Adams  (Thom Bell, Linda Creed) – 5:12
  Nathan East – bass 
  Curt Bisquera – drums 
  Chris Brooke – lead vocal engineer 
  Marq Moody – lead vocal engineer 
 "Walk on By" (Burt Bacharach, Hal David) – 3:03
 "Hey Girl" (Gerry Goffin, Carole King) – 4:33
 "The Closer I Get to You" (Reggie Lucas, James Mtume) – 4:43
 "Where Is the Love" (Ralph MacDonald, William Salter) – 3:22
  Eric Jackson – guitar 
  Mike Landau – guitar 
  Nathan East – bass 
  Curt Bisquera – drums 
 "All This Love" (El DeBarge) – 5:20
 "Always"  performed with Mone't  (David Lewis, Jonathan Lewis, Wayne Lewis) – 4:10
 "We're in This Love Together" (Roger Murrah, Keith Stegall) – 3:39
 Dave Koz – saxophone 
  Nathan East – bass 
  Curt Bisquera – drums 
  Joe Wohlmuth – lead vocal engineer 
 "How 'Bout Us" (Dana Walden) – 4:29
 "Always and Forever" (Rod Temperton) – 4:25
 "A Night to Remember" performed with Gladys Knight  (Walter Afanasieff, Jay Landers) – 4:13
  Chris Brooke – lead vocal engineer 
  Elliot Peters – lead vocal engineer

Personnel
From the liner notes for the original album:

Performers
 Johnny Mathis – vocals
 Walter Afanasieff – keyboard and rhythm programming
 Tyler Gordon – programming and Pro Tools engineer
 Mike Landau – guitar
 Mabvuto Carpenter – background vocals
 Tiffany Smith – background vocals
 Jason Morales – background vocals
 Mone't – background vocals

Production
 Walter Afanasieff – producer, arranger
 Jay Landers – executive producer
 David Channing – recording engineer
 Brian Warwick – assistant engineer
 Jonnie Davis – mixing engineer
 Ryan Geller – assistant mixing engineer
 Chris Brooke – vocal recording; additional engineering
 David Channing – additional engineering
 Tawgs Salter – additional engineering
 Tyler Gordon – additional engineering
 Doug Sax – mastering
 Sangwook "Sunny" Nam – mastering
 Rich Davis – production coordination
 Edward Blau – Johnny Mathis representation
 Christina Rodriguez – art direction and design
 Jeff Dunas – photography
 Mixed at Public Studios, New York, New York
 Mastered at The Mastering Lab, Ojai, California

References

2008 albums
Johnny Mathis albums
Albums produced by Walter Afanasieff
Columbia Records albums